The Hocasan Football Federation (HFF) is the governing body of football in Xocəsən. It organises the MSU Premier League. It is based in the Xocəsən region. In spite of holding championships, the list of objectives includes popularization of football in Xocəsən and football development on the whole. The major decisions are taken at the meetings of the Executive committee which is composed of the chairmen of relevant Federation Committees. The Observer of the Executive Committee is a chairman of Advisory Council under the President of HFF. The President of HFF takes part in the meetings of the Executive Committee. In his absence the Head of the Executive Committee presides.

The HFF Structure

Leadership

 President                                                                                                                                                                                                                                                         
 Secretary General 
 Head of the Executive Committee
 Security Commander
 Interpreter

Committees

 The Committee on organisation and implementation and regulation of the competitions-headed by Ismail Tahirli
 The Committee on Discipline and Control
 The Committee on Administration and Economy-headed by Muhammed ibn Yusuf
 International Committee on development and cooperation in Europe-headed by Teymur Khan Butayev
 Public Affairs Committee
 Committee on work with fan movement-headed by Zaur Jamiyev
 The Committee on Accident prevention

Public organizations

 Advisory Council under the President of HFF

External links
https://www.facebook.com/HFFMSU
http://hff.zz.mu

Football in Azerbaijan
Sports organizations in Baku
2015 establishments in Azerbaijan
Sports organizations established in 2015